The Singapore Medical Association (abbreviated SMA) is a professional association representing the interests of medical professionals in Singapore. It was established on September 15, 1959, replacing the Malaya Branch of the British Medical Association. As of 2020, it had over 8,200 members. It publishes the monthly peer-reviewed Singapore Medical Journal.

Controversies
On 3 November 2020, in response to complaints that online platform DoctorxDentist was listing doctors' details without consent, SMA disseminated an email to its members saying that doctors had the right to be removed from doctor directories. It also offered to assist association members who wished to disassociate from DoctorxDentist for free.

References

External links

Organizations established in 1959
1959 establishments in Singapore
Organisations based in Singapore
Medical associations based in Asia
Professional associations based in Singapore